Pester may refer to:

In fictional characters:
 Pester (comics), a Marvel Comics character
 Professor Pester, the main villain in the animated television series Viva Piñata
 Rex Pester, a reporter in the animated film The Rugrats Movie

In people:
 Bill Pester, aka, the Hermit of Palm Springs
 De Pester(s), a Dutch noble family
 Lorie (singer) (born 1982), born Laure Pester, French pop singer
 Paul Pester, chief executive officer (CEO) of TSB Bank (United Kingdom)

In other uses:
 Pešter, a plateau in southwestern Serbia
 Pester Ball, a ball that releases a Pokémon repellent in Pokémon
 Pester Lloyd, a German-language weekly newspaper in Hungary

See also
 Nagging
 Peştere (disambiguation), at least two villages in Romania
 Nudge (disambiguation)
 Annoy
 Victorificate